Pelthydrus suffarcinatus, is a species of water scavenger beetle endemic to Sri Lanka.

Description
Body length of male is about 2.35 to 2.60 mm. Body oval and convex. There are distinctive, curved ridges in the apical third of the elytra. Elytral apical end is broadly rounded, and slightly drawn in at the elytral suture. Mesosternal process reduced on the clearly raised median ridge. Metasternal surface is broadly deltoid. Aedeagus almost built parallel, then slightly curved outwards.

References 

Hydrophilidae
Insects of Sri Lanka
Beetles described in 1995